Thomas Wallstab (born 29 January 1968) is a German racewalker. He competed in the men's 50 kilometres walk at the 1996 Summer Olympics.

References

1968 births
Living people
Athletes (track and field) at the 1996 Summer Olympics
German male racewalkers
Olympic athletes of Germany
Place of birth missing (living people)